The British Muslim Heritage Centre, formerly the GMB National College, College Road, Whalley Range, Manchester, is an early Gothic Revival building. The centre was designated a Grade II* listed building on 3 October 1974.

History and description
The college was built as an Independent (i.e. Congregational) college in 1840–43, the architects being Irwin and Chester. The site was in the new suburb whose development had been begun about 10 years earlier by Samuel Brooks; its name later became Whalley Range. The aim of the Lancashire Independent College was a project of the Lancashire Congregational Union to provide higher education for Non-Conformists who were excluded from the Universities of Oxford and Cambridge until 1871. This included a new college building and moving the staff from Blackburn Academy which was then closed. The three founders were George Hadfield, Thomas Raffles and William Roby (minister of the Grosvenor Street Chapel, London Road, Manchester). The Blackburn Academy arose from courses of lessons given to prospective Congregational ministers by William Roby who was supported by the Manchester merchant Robert Spear. When the principal, Joseph Fletcher, left for London the academy became the Lancashire Independent College and moved to Manchester. The college became known much later as the Northern Congregational College.

The similarity of design to an Oxbridge college is therefore easily understood. 
The marshy nature of the area, then called Jackson's Moss, meant that 4½ feet (135 cm) of peat had to be dug away before safe construction could begin.
Nikolaus Pevsner commended the "long, very impressive, ashlar-faced, Gothic front." The wings culminate in a "tall, fanciful" tower, with a "two-storey Gothic oriel (window)." The entrance and assembly halls were re-ordered by Alfred Waterhouse in 1876–80 and Pevsner considered them "disappointing, but the rooms along the piano nobile are very charming, their Gothic fireplaces, ceilings and doorcases nicely varied."

During World War II it was used to house refugee academics, mainly from Czecho-Slovakia. 
The later name of the college was the Northern Congregational College, who used the premises until 1985 when they joined the Northern Baptist College in Luther King House, Brighton Grove.

The building became the national college of the GMB in the late 20th century and trained many trades-union negotiators. The GMB sold the college in 2004 as it was considered too expensive to maintain.  After a period of uncertainty, the building was purchased by the British Muslim Heritage Centre to "serve as a focus for Muslim heritage and identity in Britain".

In January 2013 and 2014, the building was nominated for the Arts and Culture Awareness award at the British Muslim Awards.

Nasar Mahmood currently serves as a trustee of the centre. He was awarded an OBE in the Queen's New Year Honours List in 2019.

See also

Grade II* listed buildings in Greater Manchester
Listed buildings in Manchester-M16

Notes

Bibliography

Further reading
Anon. (1878) Memorial of the Opening of the New and Enlarged Buildings of Lancashire Independent College. Manchester: Tubbs and Brook
Anon. (1943) Lancashire Independent College, 1843–1943. [Manchester: the College, 1943]
Christie Hospital and Holt Radium Institute (1935) Souvenir programme of the garden party held on the occasion of the visit of Her Royal Highness The Duchess of York on Wednesday, 10 July 1935 at the Lancashire Independent College, Whalley Range, Manchester. Manchester: Service Guild
Field, Clive D. (1989) 'Sources for the Study of Protestant Nonconformity in the John Rylands University Library of Manchester', Bulletin of the John Rylands University Library of Manchester, vol. 71, no. 2 (1989), pp. 108–11 (information about the college library). 
Hadfield, George (1841) An Address Intended to Have Been Delivered on the Occasion of Laying the Foundation Stone of the Lancashire Independent College at Withington, near Manchester. London: Hamilton, Adams & Co.
Thompson, Joseph (1893) Lancashire Independent College, 1843–1893. Jubilee Memorial Volume. Manchester: J. E. Cornish

External links
 

Former theological colleges in England
GMB (trade union)
Grade II* listed buildings in Manchester
Grade II* listed religious buildings and structures
Museums in Greater Manchester
Proposed museums in the United Kingdom
Religious museums in England
Professional education in Manchester
Christianity in Manchester
Islam in Manchester